Pine Knob is a peak in the Allegheny Mountains of Pennsylvania. This mountain is a satellite peak of its larger neighbor Blue Knob. The latter mountain is connected to Pine Knob; the saddle elevation between the peaks is 

There are no roads or hiking trails to the top of Pine Knob. The town of Ski Gap, shown on older topo maps as "Fredericksburg", lies at the southern base of the mountain.

There is also a Pine Knob in Fayette County, Pennsylvania (2,065 ft).

References

Blue Knob Quadrangle, Pennsylvania, 7.5 Minute Series (Topographic)

Mountains of Pennsylvania
Allegheny Mountains
Landforms of Blair County, Pennsylvania